Destination X is a professional wrestling pay-per-view (PPV) event held by Impact Wrestling currently in the month of August. The event primarily revolves around the X-Division, the 2005, 2006, 2009, and 2010 events had Ultimate X matches.

It was announced on TNA Wrestling's official website in January 2011 that Destination X was moving from March to July, switching places with TNA's traditional July PPV, Victory Road. On the June 21, 2012, edition of Impact, it was announced that every year the current X Division Champion will have an opportunity to give up their title for a shot at the TNA World Heavyweight Championship at Destination X. On January 11, 2013, TNA announced that in 2013 there would be only four PPVs, not including Destination X, although Destination X would be featured as a special episode of Impact Wrestling from 2013 to 2017.

Events

References

External links
 TNAWrestling.com - the official website of Total Nonstop Action Wrestling